Note Bleu: Best of the Blue Note Years 1998–2005 is a "best of" or "greatest hits" compilation from avant-jazz-funk organ trio Medeski Martin & Wood, released in 2006 and featuring select songs from all of the band's albums released on Blue Note Records.  (The band has since started an independent label, Indirecto Records.)

Note Bleu was also released in a Deluxe Edition, featuring 3 bonus tracks and a Bonus DVD.

Track listing
"The Dropper" – 3:32
"Sugar Craft" – 3:19
"I Wanna Ride You" – 3:25
"Nocturne" – 4:02
"Partido Alto" – 5:44
"Hey-Hee-Hi-Ho" (Billy Martin remix) – 3:56
"Note Bleu" – 3:02
"Pappy Check" – 2:43
"Mami Gato" – 4:08
"Off the Table" – 4:16
"Queen Bee" – 4:55
"Hypnotized" – 5:03
"Hey Joe" – 5:01
"End of the World Party" – 5:09
"Uninvisible" – 3:37

Deluxe Edition CD:
"Whiney Bitches" – 3:04
"The Builder" (from The Dropper Japanese version) – 3:28
"Toy Dancing" – 6:35

Bonus DVD
The Deluxe Edition Bonus DVD includes the following:

Music Videos:
"Partido Alto" - Directed by: Adam Bork
"The Dropper" - Directed by: Adam Bork
"Uninvisible" - Directed by: Bill Gilman

Live Performances:
Texaco Jazz Festival - "Sugar Craft" > "Ankhnaton" (Sun Ra) - with DJ Logic - 13:14
The performance took place on June 8, 1998 at the Texaco Jazz Festival, New York, NY
Produced, Directed and Edited by: Chuck Fishbein for Crazy Duck Productions
NewPort JVC Jazz Festival - "New Planet" and "Queen Bee" - 12:16
The performance took place on August 13, 2005 at the JVC Jazz Festival, Newport, RI
Produced by JVC and Festival Productions, Inc.

Documentaries:
Foreplay (2004) - Directed by: Libby Spears & Sarah Flack / Bluprint Films - 9:50
 Medeski Martin & Wood's "The Dropper" (2002) - Directed by: Marie-Pierre Jaury / Mezzo/Point Du Jour - 30:00

Performers
John Medeski – keyboards
Billy Martin – drums, percussion
Chris Wood – basses

References
Note Bleu Album Information at MMW.net
mmwhistory.com - List of all known performances by MMW

External links
In-depth Note Bleu Review at Popmatters.com

2006 greatest hits albums
2006 video albums
Blue Note Records compilation albums
Medeski Martin & Wood compilation albums
Blue Note Records video albums
2006 live albums
Live video albums
Music video compilation albums
Medeski Martin & Wood video albums